Jan Kantůrek (4 May 1948 – 22 March 2018)  was a Czech translator of fantasy, science fiction, comics and Western fiction from English. His most known translations are Discworld by Terry Pratchett and books about Conan the Barbarian by Robert E. Howard and his successors.

Life
He was married with two children and lived in Prague. Between 1975 and 1990, Kantůrek worked as a copy editor in the Artia publishing house. From 1990 to 1992 he worked as a director of marketing department in the Aventinum publishing house. Since 1992 he worked as a translator.

In 1984 he co-re-established a fan club of Jules Verne, and started translating for its fanzines. He was a comic collector and, according to his own words, he could read English but not speak it.

He also performed as the Librarian in theatrical productions of Pratchett's books. He was awarded "Best Translator" by the Czech Academy of science fiction, fantasy and horrors in 1995, 1996, 1997, and 1999. Discworld was awarded "Best Book Series" in the same years. In 2003 he received an award for his lifetime work in science fiction by the Academy.

References

1948 births
2018 deaths
Czech translators
Writers from Zlín
English–Czech translators
20th-century translators